Lukáš Pauschek (born 9 December 1992) is a Slovak footballer who plays as right back for Slovan Bratislava.

International career
On 6 August 2012, Pauschek was called up to the senior team for the first time by new managers Michal Hipp and Stanislav Griga for the team's friendly match against Denmark on 15 August 2012. He made his international debut in the match starting as a left back; Slovakia won 3–1. Pauschek returned to the national team under Pavel Hapal but did not make an appearance during the autumn of 2020. Pauschek eventually returned to international gameplay after more than 4 years under Štefan Tarkovič on 30 March 2021 in a home World Cup qualifier against Russia. He came on as a second-half stoppage time replacement for Peter Pekarík during the 2-1 victory, which saw an improved performance from Slovakia following two upsetting ties with Cyprus and Malta in previous days.

Honours

Club
Slovan Bratislava
Fortuna Liga (5):  2010–11, 2012–13, 2019–20, 2020–21, 2021–22
Slovnaft Cup (4): 2010–11, 2012–13, 2019–20, 2020–21

Mlada Boleslav
Czech Cup (1): 2015-16

References

External links
Slovan Bratislava profile

1992 births
Living people
Footballers from Bratislava
Association football defenders
Slovak footballers
Slovakia international footballers
ŠK Slovan Bratislava players
AC Sparta Prague players
Bohemians 1905 players
FK Mladá Boleslav players
Slovak Super Liga players
Czech First League players
2. Liga (Slovakia) players
Expatriate footballers in the Czech Republic
Slovak expatriate sportspeople in the Czech Republic
Slovak expatriate footballers
Slovakia under-21 international footballers